Dial Global Local (formerly Waitt Radio Networks) was a national radio network based in Omaha, Nebraska, formerly owned by NRG Media and purchased in April 2008 by Triton Radio Networks. As a subsidiary of Dial Global, they specialized in 24-hour formats for affiliated radio stations across the United States and Canada which are specifically localized for their client stations, although they also were known for commercial production services. Dial Global Local also provides their affiliates with coverage of breaking news events.

In June 2012, due to reorganizations at Dial Global, the Dial Global Local 24/7 formats were fully integrated into Dial Global's portfolio of formats, and "Dial Global Local" ceased to exist as a brand name.  However, most of the former Dial Global Local formats are still offered to affiliate stations in the same manner in which they were previously offered.  Three formats - Rock 2.0, Good Time Oldies, and Hits Now! - are available in Local versions only (the latter being a former Dial Global Total offering).

24-hour formats currently (June 2012) offered by Dial Global in Local versions include:

Former networks included The Lounge (adult standards/soft AC, discontinued in June 2012); Modern Rock (replaced by Rock 2.0); and Bob FM (replaced by Jack FM, now a Dial Global Total offering).

On April 30, 2008, it was announced that NRG Media had sold the assets of Waitt Radio Networks to Triton Radio Networks, which also operates Dial Global Digital 24/7 formats (once part of Westwood One). According to Dial Global's website, Dial Global's plans are to merge Waitt's existing 24-hour formats and commercial production services into its own operations . The merger was complete in 2010.

External links
 Dial Global formats

Companies based in Omaha, Nebraska
Triton Media Group
Defunct radio networks in the United States
Defunct radio stations in the United States